"Roll to Me" is a song by Scottish pop rock band Del Amitri, released as the third single from their 1995 album, Twisted. The song became their biggest hit in the United States when it reached number 10 on the Billboard Hot 100 chart. It was a moderate hit in the United Kingdom, peaking at number 22 on the UK Singles Chart. It ended up becoming their biggest hit.

Track listings

UK CD1
 "Roll to Me"
 "In the Frame"
 "Food for Songs" (acoustic version)
 "One Thing Left to Do" (acoustic version)

UK CD2
 "Roll to Me"
 "Spit in the Rain"
 "Stone Cold Sober"
 "Move Away Jimmy Blue"

UK cassette single and European CD single
 "Roll to Me"
 "In the Frame"

US CD single
 "Roll to Me" – 2:12
 "Long Way Down" – 3:29
 "Scared to Live" – 4:44
 "Someone Else Will" – 4:48

US cassette single
A. "Roll to Me" (LP version)
B. "Long Way Down"

Charts

Weekly charts

Year-end charts

Release history

References

1995 singles
1995 songs
A&M Records singles
Del Amitri songs